Saint-Jean-devant-Possesse (literally Saint-Jean before Possesse) is a commune in the Marne department in north-eastern France.

See also
Communes of the Marne department

References

Saintjeandevantpossesse